Coleto Creek is a  stream in Texas. It runs through the small town of Yorktown, Texas. It feeds the Coleto Creek Reservoir. Its mouth is at the Guadalupe River.

Coleto is a name derived Spanish meaning either "jacket" or "a man's body".

See also
List of rivers of Texas

References

Rivers of Texas
Rivers of Victoria County, Texas
Rivers of Goliad County, Texas